Forn is a surname.

People with the surname include:
 Ivar Andreas Forn (born 1983), Norwegian footballer
 Joaquim Forn (born 1964), Spanish Catalan politician
 Josep Maria Forn (born 1928), Spanish actor and filmmaker
 Juan Forn (1959–2021), Argentine writer and translator
 Teresa Forn (born 1959), Spanish Catalan runner